Guardian: The Lonely and Great God is a South Korean television series starring Gong Yoo in the title role, alongside Kim Go-eun, Lee Dong-wook, Yoo In-na, and Yook Sung-jae. Written by Kim Eun-sook, the series aired on tvN from December 2, 2016, to January 21, 2017.

Its final episode recorded an 18.68% nationwide audience share, making it the sixth highest-rated drama in Korean cable television history. It received critical acclaim and became a cultural phenomenon in South Korea. The series won numerous awards, including the Grand Prize (Daesang) for writer Kim Eun-sook and Best Actor for Gong Yoo at the 53rd Baeksang Arts Awards.

Synopsis
Kim Shin (Gong Yoo), a decorated military general from the Goryeo Dynasty, is framed as a traitor and killed by the young king. Years after his death, he is cursed by the Almighty to stay immortal forever, enduring the pain of seeing his loved ones die as punishment for the soldiers he killed to protect his country. He becomes an immortal goblin, helping people with his powers and being a kind man in spite of his grieving past. The only way to put an end to his immortality is the Goblin's bride, whose aid in pulling out the sword will end his painful immortality.

Ji Eun-tak (Kim Go-eun) is a bubbly high school student who remains cheerful and hopeful despite her tragic life. She summons the Goblin by chance and their fates begin to entwine. The Goblin's nephew, Yoo Deok-hwa (Yook Sung-jae), leases the Goblin's house to a Grim Reaper (Lee Dong-wook) and the two end up living under the same roof. Ji Eun-tak starts working a part-time job at a chicken store run by a charismatic young woman, Sunny (Yoo In-na).

As the lives of Kim Shin, Grim Reaper, Ji Eun-tak and Sunny interweave, a deeper story unfolds, as they are not just strangers who met by chance, but people with deep-rooted relations.

Cast

Main
Gong Yoo as Goblin / Kim Shin  
A 940-year-old immortal goblin and protector of souls who is in search for his bride, who is the only one who can remove the sword piercing through his chest. Once the sword is removed, he may finally move to the afterlife and rest in peace. He served as a General during the Goryeo era, where he was appointed as the regent with his sister being betrothed to the young king Wang Yeo. However, due to corruption by a eunuch, the king's guards killed Kim Shin's sister, soldiers, and household before ultimately killing him with the very sword that is lodged in his chest. As both a reward for the good he had done for his country, and a punishment for all the deaths that he caused, the Almighty God grants him immortality. As he has lived for centuries, he feels lonely and depressed as he has to watch his loved ones and those around him pass away. This is until he slowly falls in love with his bride who gives him a reason to live again.

Kim Go-eun as Ji Eun-tak 
 as young Ji Eun-tak
An optimistic and bubbly 19-year-old high school student and the legendary Goblin's bride. A "Missing Soul", she can see ghosts and summon the Goblin due to her way of birth; her pregnant mom was in a hit-and-run at the time to which the Goblin intervened to save them both, before the Grim Reaper could take them. Orphaned at age 9 and pursued by the Grim Reaper, she was forced to live with her abusive aunt who was seeking her mother's life insurance money. She immediately becomes interested in the Goblin, who takes her in his home so she can pass her exams and enroll in university, while he begins to rediscover the joy of living through her. Originally oblivious to her duty of removing the sword from the Goblin's chest, she eventually learns the truth and struggles with the decision of fulfilling her duty as she has fallen in love with the Goblin.

Lee Dong-wook as Grim Reaper / Wang Yeo
Kim Min-jae as young Wang Yeo
A good-looking, cynical yet humorous grim reaper (Angel of Death) who guides souls to their reincarnations or afterlives and Kim Shin's housemate. Along with many other grim reapers, he became a grim reaper after committing the greatest sin of all in his past life. He has no memory of his past lives, but does possess supernatural powers. Originally preferring to be by himself, he falls in love with a chicken restaurant owner named Sunny who eventually reciprocates his feelings. Through her, he begins to unlock clues to his memories and who he was in the past. His past life was revealed to be the young king: Wang Yeo. Despite the king's original pleasant personality, he became corrupted by the power hungry eunuch and orders his guards to kill everyone including his own wife and his loyal general, Kim Shin. This act drove Wang Yeo insane and caused him to ultimately take his own life.

Yoo In-na as Sunny / Kim Sun
Kim So-hyun as young Kim Sun 
The attractive owner of a chicken restaurant who hires Ji Eun-tak. The Grim Reaper begins to fall in love with her, and she soon returns his affection, although she is constantly confused by the Grim Reaper's constant social awkwardness. In her past life, it is revealed that she was the younger sister of General Kim Shin and she became the queen upon marrying King Wang Yeo (now the Grim Reaper). The couple were happily in love until the eunuch began to warp the mind of the king.  When Wang Yeo tried to exile his loyal general Kim Shin, she supported her brother as he stood up to the king's ridiculous order and was executed as a result.

Yook Sung-jae as Yoo Deok-hwa
 as young Yoo Deok-hwa
 as teenage Deok-hwa
A rebellious yet kind-hearted chaebol heir and the only grandson of the Yoo family, a household that has the responsibility of taking care of the Goblin. He originally is a spoiled young adult who was only looking after the Goblin in order to receive a new credit card (after he was cut off). However, he learns of the Goblin and the Grim Reaper's true identities, and the trio grew to become strong friends. It is later revealed that the Almighty God had taken over his body for a period of time so that he could enact his plan of intertwining the lives of Kim Shin, Ji Eun-tak, The Grim Reaper, and Sunny

Supporting
 Lee El as Samshin, Goddess, the creator of birth and fate
 Kim Byung-chul as Park Joong-heon, a cunning and manipulative eunuch from the Goryeo Dynasty
  as Chairman Yoo Shin-woo, Deok-hwa's grandfather
Jo Woo-jin as Kim Do-young, Deok-hwa's secretary
 Yeom Hye-ran as Ji Yeon-sook, Eun-tak's maternal aunt
  as Park Kyung-shik, Eun-tak's male cousin
 Choi Ri as Park Kyung-mi, Eun-tak's female cousin

Others
 Hwang Seok-jeong as triplet sisters; two of them as a shaman fortune teller and a ghost
 Ham Sung-min as North Korean soldier

Ghost around Eun-tak
 Ahn Ji-hyun as Go Jung-hyun, the ghost in the library who was Eun-tak's mother's best friend
 Park Kyung-hye as Virgin Ghost, who always tries to take Eun-tak with her
 Park Se-wan as Go Shi-won, the ghost who asked Eun-tak to clean her dormitory and fill it up with food so that her mother will not be sad (Ep. 2, 4-5)
  as Lee Jung-hwa, a vengeance ghost whose husband killed her (Ep. 4, 6-7, 9, 11)
 Go Soo-jung as a ghost (Ep. 2)

People around Eun-tak
 Noh Gang-min as the boy in the back-alley of the chicken shop who thinks he has wind powers
 Kim Min-young as Park Soo-jin, Eun-tak's schoolmate who harasses her and takes pictures of her and the Goblin
 Go Bo-gyeol as Kim Yoon-ah, Eun-tak's class president who defends her and later becomes her friend
 Kim Nan-hee as Eun-tak's homeroom teacher who discriminates against her because she's an orphan
 Ma Min-hee as one of Soo-jin's friends
 Yoon Hee-kyung as one of Soo-jin's friends

Grim Reapers around Wang Yeo
  as a Batch 21 Grim Reaper who is very serious about his work
 Choi Woong as Wang Yeo's junior grim reaper who lives in the rooftop above Sunny's apartment
 Jo Hyun-sik as a Batch 22 Grim Reaper
  as a Batch 23 Grim Reaper
 Yun Da-yeong as a Batch 23 Grim Reaper who was once Wang Yeo's Court Lady

Others
 Kim Nam-hee as Overworked doctor in ER
 Yoon Kyung-ho as Kim Woo-sik, Kim Shin's loyal lieutenant from the Goryeo era (Ep. 1, 12, 14)
 Lee Moon-soo as a loyal old man from the Goryeo era who kept Kim Shin's body (Ep. 1)
 Nam Da-reum as Kim Soo-bok, the boy who met the Goblin in Paris (Ep. 1, 4)
 Park Jin Woo as Loan Shark (Ep. 2-3, 6)
 Yoon Joo-man as Loan Shark (Ep. 2-3, 6)
 Lee Seul-bi as a vain woman at café (Ep. 3)
 Kim Hyun-mok as Bus Passenger (Ep. 8)
 Kim Hye-yoon as the young era of a widowed old lady (Ep. 15)

Special appearances
 Park Hee-von as Ji Yeon-hee, Ji Eun-tak's mother (Ep. 1, 7)
 Kim Min-jae as Wang Yeo  (Ep. 1, 7-13)
Kim So-hyun as Kim Shin's sister (Queen) 
 Jung Hae-in as Choi Tae-hee, Ji Eun-tak's first love (Ep. 7, 8)

Production

Development
The series was written by Kim Eun-sook, who also wrote the popular series Secret Garden (2010), The Heirs (2013), and Descendants of the Sun (2016). The drama marked her second collaboration with director Lee Eun-bok after both worked on Descendants.

Filming
The first script-reading was held at Nuri Dream Square in Sangam-dong, Seoul, South Korea, on 30 August 2016. The Goryeo-era flashback scenes were filmed on Gimje, North Jeolla Province on September 22 for the battlefield scenes, while the palace scenes were shot at Naju Image Theme Park. Goblin and Grim Reaper's house (external shots) was filmed at (formerly) Unhyeongung's Western House, presently inside Duksung Women's University (utilized for administration offices).

Overseas filming mainly took place in Quebec City, Quebec, Canada in October, using locations such as the Château Frontenac, Parc du Bastion-de-la-Reine (the Yoo family cemetery), Petit Champlain (Goblin's door to Canada), and the Fontaine de Tourny.

The crew was awarded a special vacation to Phuket, Thailand after the end of the drama.

Original soundtrack

Album

Singles

Part 1

Part 2

Part 3

Part 4

Part 5

Part 6

Part 7

Part 8

Part 9

Part 10

Part 11

Part 12

Part 13

Part 14

There was a controversy surrounding the release of the song "Round and Round". Originally, the song was sung by Han Soo-ji. However, when the song was officially released, Han was merely a featuring on the track, which was sung by Heize. This caused dissatisfaction among fans, who loved Han's voice. CJ E&M released an official apology, saying that Han was enlisted to record just the first 50 seconds of the song, but the writer of the song, Nam Hye-seung, requested since the beginning that the full song be sung by another vocalist.

Chart performance

Reception
The series was popular among the international audience, which led to parodies of the drama on various social media sites, notably by both celebrities and political figures.

The drama has also sparked various fashion trends. Items and accessories worn by the cast members, such as the Lanvin coat worn by Gong Yoo, Lancôme lipstick used by Kim Go-eun and Fedora worn by Lee Dong-wook saw an increase in sales. Kim In-yook's poetry book, The Physics of Love, gained renewed attention after one of its verses was featured in the drama. There was also an increase in visitors at the various filming sites of Guardian, which contributed to a positive economic effect on the country. Additionally, original soundtracks featured in the series also topped local digital music charts. Since 2017, it has surpassed Descendants of the Sun (2016) in video-on-demand sales.

The Korea Times stated, "Its success was attributed to the creative plot" and "...the depth of perspective looking at life of the goblin that bears a bloody sword in his chest and has been given eternal life as punishment, immerses the audience into the fantasy story. The twist and complexity of life and death make the story more interesting."

Despite its success, Guardian was criticized for its several consumer product placements which drew an estimated 2-4 billion KRW from revenue. TV and cultural critics also criticized some aspects of the drama; such as the Cinderella complex feature in the series, where female lead is able to summon the male lead, who has supernatural powers. Furthermore, the female lead portrayed a poor high school student attracted to the male lead's rich 30-something man, which the show poked fun of when a classmate described him as a "sugar daddy". The drama was also criticized for its over-dramatic plot.

Viewership
The drama consistently topped cable television viewership ratings in its time slot. Its final episode recorded an 18.680% nationwide audience share according to Nielsen paid platform, making the episode the second highest rated in Korean cable television history. It became the first cable drama to surpass 20% ratings.

Awards and nominations

Notes

References

External links
  
 
 
 

TVN (South Korean TV channel) television dramas
Korean-language television shows
2016 South Korean television series debuts
South Korean fantasy television series
Television shows written by Kim Eun-sook
South Korean romantic fantasy television series
Television series by Studio Dragon
Television shows set in Quebec City
Television shows filmed in Quebec City
Television series set in Goryeo
Television series by Hwa&Dam Pictures
Television shows set in Incheon
2017 South Korean television series endings
Television shows set in Seoul